Eef Haaze (born 11 August 1982) is a Dutch female canoeist who won a silver medal at individual senior level at the European Wildwater Championships.

References

External links
 

1982 births
Living people
Dutch female canoeists
Place of birth missing (living people)
21st-century Dutch women